Melanie Rapp Beale (born September 5, 1964) is a former Republican member of the Virginia House of Delegates. While serving on the York County Board of Supervisors, Beale won a special election in 2000 to succeed Jo Ann Davis after her election to the United States House of Representatives. She went on to be reelected three times, after which she accepted a job with Dominion Virginia Power.

In 2019, Beale ran again for the House of Delegates in the 96th district. She lost the Republican primary to former legislative staffer Amanda Batten.

References

External links
 

1964 births
Republican Party members of the Virginia House of Delegates
Women state legislators in Virginia
21st-century American politicians
Christopher Newport University alumni
Living people